Syllepte is a genus of moths of the family Crambidae.

Species
Syllepte abyssalis (Snellen, 1892)
Syllepte achromalis Hampson, 1912
Syllepte acridentalis Hampson, 1912
Syllepte adductalis (Walker, 1859)
Syllepte aechmisalis (Walker, 1859)
Syllepte aenigmatica E. Hering, 1901
Syllepte ageneta Turner, 1908
Syllepte agraphalis Hampson, 1912
Syllepte albicostalis Schaus, 1920
Syllepte albifurcalis Dognin, 1913
Syllepte albirivalis Hampson, 1912
Syllepte albitorquata Tams, 1924
Syllepte albopunctum Guillermet, 1996
Syllepte amando (Cramer, 1779)
Syllepte amelialis Viette, 1957
Syllepte amissalis (Guenée, 1854)
Syllepte amoyalis Caradja, 1925
Syllepte anchuralis Schaus, 1920
Syllepte angulifera (Druce, 1895)
Syllepte argillosa Guillermet in Viette & Guillermet, 1996
Syllepte atrisquamalis (Hampson, 1912)
Syllepte attenualis (Hampson, 1912)
Syllepte aureotinctalis (Kenrick, 1917)
Syllepte azadesalis Schaus, 1927
Syllepte banosalis Schaus, 1927
Syllepte belialis (Walker, 1859)
Syllepte benedictalis Holland, 1900
Syllepte berambalis Schaus, 1927
Syllepte bipartalis Hampson, 1899
Syllepte birdalis (Schaus, 1920)
Syllepte bitjecola (Strand, 1920)
Syllepte brunneiterminalis Hampson, 1918
Syllepte brunnescens (Hampson, 1912)
Syllepte butlerii (Dewitz, 1881)
Syllepte capnosalis Caradja, 1925
Syllepte carbatinalis (Swinhoe, 1890)
Syllepte cathanalis Schaus, 1927
Syllepte chalybifascia Hampson, 1896
Syllepte christophalis (Viette, 1988)
Syllepte cissalis Yamanaka, 1987
Syllepte coelivitta (Walker, 1866)
Syllepte cohaesalis (Walker, 1866
Syllepte cometa (Warren, 1896)
Syllepte commotes Tams, 1935
Syllepte consimilalis (Lederer, 1863)
Syllepte crenilinealis Hampson, 1918
Syllepte curiusalis (Walker, 1859)
Syllepte cyanea (Walker, 1866)
Syllepte dentilinea Gaede, 1916
Syllepte desmialis (Hampson, 1912)
Syllepte diacymalis (Hampson, 1912)
Syllepte dialis (Schaus, 1912)
Syllepte dinawa Kenrick, 1912
Syllepte dioptalis (Walker, 1866)
Syllepte disciselenalis (Hampson, 1918)
Syllepte disticta (Hampson, 1912)
Syllepte distinguenda E. Hering, 1901
Syllepte dottoalis (Schaus, 1927)
Syllepte elegans West, 1931
Syllepte elphegalis Schaus, 1927
Syllepte erebarcha (Meyrick, 1939)
Syllepte eriopisalis (Walker, 1859)
Syllepte fabiusalis (Walker, 1859)
Syllepte favillacealis (Snellen, 1899)
Syllepte fulviceps (Bethune-Baker, 1909)
Syllepte fuscoinvalidalis Yamanaka, 1959
Syllepte fuscomarginalis (Leech, 1889)
Syllepte gastralis (Walker, 1866)
Syllepte glebalis (Lederer, 1863
Syllepte guilboti (Guillermet, 2008)
Syllepte heliochroa (Hampson, 1912)
Syllepte hemichionalis (Mabille, 1900)
Syllepte hoenei Caradja, 1925
Syllepte holochralis (Hampson, 1912)
Syllepte hyalescens (Hampson, 1898)
Syllepte incomptalis (Hübner, 1823)
Syllepte invalidalis (Leech & South, 1901)
Syllepte iophanes Meyrick, 1894
Syllepte iridescens E. Hering, 1901
Syllepte kayei Klima, 1939
Syllepte kenrickalis Viette, 1960
Syllepte lactiguttalis Warren, 1896
Syllepte lagoalis Viette, 1957
Syllepte lanatalis Viette, 1960
Syllepte laticalis (Lederer, 1863)
Syllepte leonalis (Schaus, 1893)
Syllepte leopardalis (Moore, 1888)
Syllepte leucodontia (Hampson, 1898)
Syllepte leucographalis Hampson, 1912
Syllepte lineolata (Sepp, 1855)
Syllepte lucidalis Caradja, 1925
Syllepte lygropialis West, 1931
Syllepte macallalis West, 1931
Syllepte macarealis Schaus, 1927
Syllepte machinalis (C. Felder, R. Felder & Rogenhofer, 1875)
Syllepte maculilinealis (Hampson, 1918)
Syllepte mahafalalis Marion & Viette, 1956
Syllepte malgassanalis (Viette, 1954)
Syllepte mandarinalis Caradja, 1925
Syllepte melanomma Hampson, 1912
Syllepte melanopalis Hampson, 1908
Syllepte mesoleucalis Hampson, 1898
Syllepte methyalinalis Hampson, 1912
Syllepte microdontalis Hampson, 1912
Syllepte microsema Hampson, 1912
Syllepte microspilalis Hampson, 1912
Syllepte microstictalis (Hampson, 1918)
Syllepte mildredalis Schaus, 1927
Syllepte mimalis (C. Felder, R. Felder & Rogenhofer, 1875)
Syllepte molybdopasta Hampson, 1918
Syllepte monoleuca Hampson, 1912
Syllepte nasonalis Hampson, 1898
Syllepte nebulalis Schaus, 1920
Syllepte neofulviceps
Syllepte neurogramma (Meyrick, 1939)
Syllepte nigralis (Kaye, 1925)
Syllepte nigriflava Swinhoe, 1894
Syllepte nigriscriptalis (Warren, 1896)
Syllepte nigrodentalis (Pagenstecher, 1884)
Syllepte ningpoalis (Leech, 1889)
Syllepte nitidalis (Dognin, 1905)
Syllepte nyanzana (Grünberg, 1910)
Syllepte occlusalis (Dognin, 1905)
Syllepte ochrifusalis (Hampson, 1899)
Syllepte ochritinctalis (Hampson, 1918)
Syllepte ochrotichroa (Hampson, 1918)
Syllepte ochrotozona Hampson, 1898
Syllepte ogoalis (Walker, 1859)
Syllepte opalisans (C. Felder, R. Felder & Rogenhofer, 1875)
Syllepte orbiferalis Hampson, 1898
Syllepte pactolalis (Guenée, 1854)
Syllepte pallidinotalis (Hampson, 1912)
Syllepte parvipuncta Hampson, 1912
Syllepte patagialis Zeller, 1852
Syllepte paucilinealis (Snellen, 1880)
Syllepte paucistrialis Warren, 1896
Syllepte penthodes (Meyrick, 1902)
Syllepte petroalis Schaus, 1927
Syllepte phaeophlebalis Hampson, 1912
Syllepte phaeopleura Turner, 1922
Syllepte phalangiodalis E. Hering, 1901
Syllepte philetalis (Walker, 1859)
Syllepte phricosticha Turner, 1908
Syllepte picalis Hampson, 1898
Syllepte pilocrocialis Strand, 1918
Syllepte placophaea (Turner, 1915)
Syllepte planeflava Hampson, 1912
Syllepte plumifera Hampson, 1898
Syllepte pogonodes (Hampson, 1899)
Syllepte polydonta (Hampson, 1898)
Syllepte proctizonalis (Hampson, 1918)
Syllepte pseudovialis Hampson, 1912
Syllepte purpuralis (Walker, 1866)
Syllepte purpurascens Hampson, 1899
Syllepte retractalis Hampson, 1912
Syllepte rhyparialis (Oberthür, 1893)
Syllepte rogationis Hampson, 1918
Syllepte rosalina (Strand, 1920)
Syllepte rubrifucalis Mabille, 1900
Syllepte ruricolalis (Snellen, 1880)
Syllepte sakarahalis (Marion & Viette, 1956)
Syllepte sarronalis (Walker, 1859)
Syllepte satanas E. Hering, 1901
Syllepte secreta (Meyrick, 1936)
Syllepte segnalis (Leech, 1889)
Syllepte sellalis (Guenée, 1854)
Syllepte semilugens Hampson, 1912
Syllepte seminigralis (Warren, 1896)
Syllepte semivialis (Moore, 1888)
Syllepte solilucis Hampson, 1898
Syllepte straminalis (Guenée, 1854)
Syllepte straminea Butler, 1875
Syllepte strigicincta Hampson, 1912)
Syllepte striginervalis (Guenée, 1854)
Syllepte stumpffalis Viette, 1960
Syllepte subaenescens (Warren, 1896)
Syllepte subcyaneoalba (Hampson, 1918)
Syllepte sulphureotincta (Hampson, 1918)
Syllepte taiwanalis Shibuya, 1928
Syllepte tenebrosalis (Warren, 1896)
Syllepte tetrathyralis Hampson, 1912
Syllepte thomealis (Viette, 1957)
Syllepte torsipex (Hampson, 1898)
Syllepte trachelota Turner, 1913
Syllepte trifidalis Hampson, 1908
Syllepte trizonalis (Sepp, 1855)
Syllepte tumidipes Hampson, 1912
Syllepte vagalis (Snellen, 1901
Syllepte vagans (Tutt, 1890)
Syllepte venustalis Swinhoe, 1894
Syllepte viridivertex Schaus, 1920
Syllepte vohilavalis (Viette, 1954)
Syllepte xanthothorax (Meyrick, 1933)
Syllepte xylocraspis Hampson, 1912
Syllepte zarialis (Swinhoe, 1917)

Former species
Syllepte aedilis (Meyrick, 1887)
Syllepte agilis Meyrick, 1936
Syllepte avunculalis (Saalmüller, 1880)
Syllepte balteata (Fabricius, 1798)
Syllepte batrachina Meyrick, 1936
Syllepte chromalis (Walker, 1866)
Syllepte clementsi Hampson, 1898
Syllepte concatenalis (Walker, 1866)
Syllepte crotonalis (Walker, 1859)
Syllepte denticulata (Moore, 1888)
Syllepte derogata (Fabricius, 1775)
Syllepte fuscoalbalis (Hampson, 1898)
Syllepte imbroglialis (Dyar, 1914)
Syllepte jatingaensis (Rose & Singh, 1989)
Syllepte klossi Rothschild, 1915
Syllepte lunalis (Guenée, 1854)
Syllepte mysisalis (Walker, 1859)
Syllepte neodesmialis Klima, 1939
Syllepte ovialis (Walker, 1859)
Syllepte palmalis (C. Felder, R. Felder & Rogenhofer, 1875)
Syllepte pauperalis Marion, 1954
Syllepte polycymalis (Hampson, 1912)
Syllepte posticalis (Saalmüller, 1880)
Syllepte pseudauxo (C. Felder, R. Felder & Rogenhofer, 1875)
Syllepte pseudoderogata (Strand, 1920)
Syllepte ridopalis (Swinhoe, 1892)
Syllepte sabinusalis (Walker, 1859)
Syllepte undulalis (Pagenstecher, 1907)
Syllepte viettalis (Marion, 1956)
Syllepte violacealis Guillermet in Viette & Guillermet, 1996

References

 
Crambidae genera
Spilomelinae
Taxa named by Jacob Hübner